Hirodai Fuzokugakkō Mae is a Hiroden station (tram stop) on Hiroden Ujina Line, located in Minami-ku, Hiroshima.

Routes
From Hirodai Fuzokugakkō Mae Station, there are four of Hiroden Streetcar routes.

 Hiroshima Station - Hiroshima Port Route
 Hiroden-nishi-hiroshima - Hiroshima Port Route
 Hiroshima Station - (via Hijiyama-shita) - Hiroshima Port Route

Connections
█ Ujina Line
  
Minami-machi 6-chome — Hirodai Fuzokugakkō Mae — Kenbyoin-mae

Around station
Elementary School attached to Hiroshima University
High School attached to Hiroshima University

History
Opened on as "Miyuki-bashi" tram stop, named from the bridge "Miyuki", on December 27, 1935.
Closed from May 1942 to August 1945.
Reopened in August 1945, and renamed to "Minami-bunko-mae".
Renamed to "Hirodai-Kyoyoubu-mae" in 1955.
Renamed to "Hirodai-Fuzoku-Kouko-mae" on February 28, 1961.
Renamed to the present name "" on June 10, 1964

See also
Hiroden Streetcar Lines and Routes
List of railway stations in Japan

Hirodai Fuzokugakko Mae Station
Railway stations in Japan opened in 1935